Shaina is a 2020 Zimbabwean television film directed by Beautie Masvaure Alt and produced by Siphiwe Hlabangane. The film stars Wilmah Munemera with Tinodiwanashe Chitma, Gamu Mukwakwami, Tarumbidwa Chirume, and Joylene Malenga in supporting roles. The film is about a Zimbabwean teenager Shine, and group of friends who encounter life-changing obstacles which they deal with forgiveness and friendship.

The film made its premier on 21 August 2020 on ZBC-TV. The film received positive reviews from critics. This film was produced the support of the American People through the United States Agency for International Development (USAID). The film was also nominated for the Peabody Awards for Public Service. The film is largely made as an awareness program to give health messages on key issues such as poverty, pregnancy, maternal and child health, gender-based violence, malaria, and tuberculosis.

Cast
 Wilmah Munemera as Shine
 Tinodiwanashe Chitma as Zo
 Gamu Mukwakwami as Stella
 Tarumbidwa Chirume as Busi
 Joylene Malenga as Miss Muzondo
 Tadiwa Marowa as Faro
 Charmaine Mujeri as Mai Faro
 Tongai Sammy T. Mundawarara as Constable Mathius
 Jesesi Mungoshi as Ambuya
 Eddie Sandifolo as Simba
 Fadzai Simango as Brian

References

External links 
 

Zimbabwean drama films
2020 films
2020 television films
2020 drama films